Erick Leonel Castillo Arroyo (born 5 February 1995) is an Ecuadorian professional footballer who plays as a winger for Barcelona SC on loan from Liga MX club Tijuana and the Ecuador national team.

Club career
Born in Eloy Alfaro, Esmeraldas, Castillo joined Independiente del Valle's youth setup in 2011. After failing to make his breakthrough, he signed a contract with Norte América and subsequently signed for LDU Loja on loan.

Castillo made his professional debut on 29 March 2013, starting in a 2–1 away loss against Emelec. His first goal came on 25 August, the opener in a 3–1 home win against Barcelona.

On 7 January 2014 Castillo joined Barcelona, but was subsequently loaned to Olmedo for one year. He was converted into a left back during the campaign, as his side suffered relegation.

Back to Barcelona, Castillo mainly featured as a substitute during his first two seasons. On 26 February 2017, he scored a brace in a 3–2 home win against El Nacional.

International career
On 5 September 2019 Castillo made his debut appearance for Ecuador against Peru, where he scored to only goal in a 1–0 win.

Career statistics

International goals
Scores and results list Ecuador's goal tally first.

References

External links
Ecuafutbol profile 

1995 births
Living people
People from Eloy Alfaro Canton
Ecuadorian footballers
Ecuador international footballers
Association football defenders
Association football wingers
Ecuadorian Serie A players
C.S.D. Independiente del Valle footballers
L.D.U. Loja footballers
Barcelona S.C. footballers
C.D. Olmedo footballers
Club Tijuana footballers
Santos Laguna footballers
FC Juárez footballers
Liga MX players
Expatriate footballers in Mexico
Ecuadorian expatriate sportspeople in Mexico
C.S. Norte América footballers